The Brandaris is a lighthouse on the Dutch Wadden Sea island Terschelling, in Friesland. It is the oldest lighthouse in the Netherlands, listed as a Rijksmonument, number 35032 and rated with a very high historical value.

History 
The first tower was built in 1323 to guide ships on their way to Amsterdam, through the Zuiderzee, the narrow opening between Vlieland and Terschelling. A good position marking was necessary because many islands in the North Sea look very similar.

When the sea flooded Terschelling in 1570 the tower was completely destroyed. In 1592 the construction of a new tower was started, but it collapsed before it was finished because bad building materials had been used. The current tower was built in 1594.

In 1837 the tower was the first lighthouse in the Netherlands to be equipped with a rotating Fresnel lens. Electrification took place in 1907. Today, the light in the tower is controlled fully automatically.

Description 
Brandaris is the oldest preserved tower specifically built as a lighthouse in the Netherlands. In 1907 it was the first lighthouse in the Netherlands to be fitted with electric lighting. Brandaris is specially equipped to prevent birds from flying against the tower.

Name 
The name of this tower may be a reference to Saint Brendan of Clonfert.

See also

 List of lighthouses in the Netherlands

References

External links

Lighthouse Brandaris Terschelling In: terschelling.org
Lighthouse Explorer

Lighthouses in Friesland
Terschelling
Rijksmonuments in Friesland
Lighthouses completed in 1323
Towers completed in the 14th century
Lighthouses completed in 1594
Towers completed in 1594